Brandstätter Group (geobra Brandstätter GmbH & Co. KG) is a German company, headquartered in Zirndorf, Bavaria. The group is composed of toy company Playmobil, Playmobil 1.2.3 Ltd, Inmold Ltd, Hob Electronics Ltd, Hob Components Ltd, HOB Inc., HOB GmbH & Co KG, and Hob Software Ltd.

In 1876, the company was founded by Andreas Brandstätter in Fürth, Bavaria and produced ornamental fittings and locks. By 1921, the company mainly was producing metal toys such as piggy banks, telephones, cash registers, and scales.

In 1954, production shifted to plastics and in the following years produced toys such as the Multi-Worker play-set. The Playmobil line of products was introduced in 1970 under Horst Brandstätter and marketed worldwide in 1975.

The Brandstätter Group produces exclusively in Europe, chiefly at its main factory in Dietenhofen, 25 km from Zirndorf, with a workforce of 750 people. Although Playmobil also has factories in Malta (700 employees), Spain and the Czech Republic, Horst Brandstätter expanded production in Germany, and invested heavily in the Dietenhofen factory. New products included the Lechuza self-watering planters.

References

External links

 Playmobil 

Companies based in Bavaria
Playmobil
German companies established in 1876
Toy companies of Germany
Toy companies established in the 19th century
Manufacturing companies established in 1876